The Magical Kenya Ladies Open is a professional golf tournament on the Ladies European Tour, first played in 2019. 

The tournament is played in Kenya at Vipingo Ridge, near Kikambala in the former Coast Province. It was the last Ladies European Tour event of the 2019 season and marked the first time professional lady golfers played competitively in the region.

In 2022, following a two-year hiatus due to the pandemic, Germany's Esther Henseleit successfully defended her title.

Winners

References

External links

Ladies European Tour
Vipingo Ridge

Magical Kenya Ladies Open
Golf tournaments in Kenya